Ardisson is a European surname.

People with the surname 
 Alexandra Valetta-Ardisson (born 1976), French politician
 Edmond Ardisson (1904–1983), French actor
 George Ardisson (1931–2014), Italian actor
 Thierry Ardisson (born 1949), French television producer and host
 Victor Ardisson (1872–1944), French grave robber

See also 
 Ardissone

Surnames of French origin
Surnames of Italian origin
French-language surnames